Gaëtan Huard (born 12 January 1962) is a French former professional footballer who played as a goalkeeper.

Football career
Born in Montargis, Loiret, Huard played 357 Ligue 1 matches for RC Lens, FC Girondins de Bordeaux and Olympique de Marseille, winning the 1989 and 1990 Division 1 championships with the latter. During the 1992–93 season with Bordeaux (which would finish third in the 1992–93 French Division 1 final standings), he enjoyed a run of 1,176 minutes (stretching between matchday 17 and 31 of the Division 1 campaign) of Division 1 football without conceding a goal. He helped Bordeaux win the 1995 UEFA Intertoto Cup.

Huard helped Bordeaux reach the 1996 UEFA Cup final, where they lost to FC Bayern Munich. The 34-year-old had a brief stint in Spain. He played for Hércules CF during the 1996–97 season, serving as a backup goalkeeper. They were relegated from the La Liga after finishing second-bottom in the table at the conclusion of the 1996–97 La Liga season, after which Huard retired from playing professional football.

Afterwards, Huard worked several years as a sports consultant for Canal+.

References

External links
Racing Lens archives 

1962 births
Living people
People from Montargis
Sportspeople from Loiret
French footballers
Association football goalkeepers
Ligue 1 players
Ligue 2 players
RC Lens players
Olympique de Marseille players
FC Girondins de Bordeaux players
La Liga players
Hércules CF players
French expatriate footballers
Expatriate footballers in Spain
Footballers from Centre-Val de Loire